Sergei Pavlovich Koshelev (born 27 January 1987) is a former Russian professional football player.

Club career
He played 3 seasons in the Russian Football National League for FC Irtysh Omsk and FC Tyumen.

External links
 
 

1987 births
People from Tyumen
Living people
Russian footballers
Association football midfielders
FC Tyumen players
FC Lada-Tolyatti players
FC Irtysh Omsk players
FC Zenit-Izhevsk players
FC Nosta Novotroitsk players
Sportspeople from Tyumen Oblast